Who Will Survive, and What Will Be Left of Them? is the second full-length release by indie rock band Murder by Death. It was released on Eyeball Records in 2003. Its title is a reference to the tagline of the 1974 film The Texas Chain Saw Massacre.

Background 
It is a concept album based around the Devil and a small Mexican border town against which he wages war.

On the band's website, Adam Turla, the band's guitarist, lead singer, and principal lyricist explained the meanings of all the songs on the album.  The following is his introduction to the explanations:

I guess the first thing I should say is that this album is not trying to be artsy, or profound or anything more than the story it is. It's meant to entertain, bring the feeling of sitting around telling ghost stories or something. Also, I'm a religious studies major, so I tied in a lot of weird religious stuff. This is just a story, there's no religious affiliation on our parts. So there's my disclaimer.

Track listing

References

External links
Who Will Survive and What Will Be Left of Them? lyrics

2003 albums
Murder by Death (band) albums
Concept albums